Newbiggin is a village and civil parish near the larger village of Temple Sowerby, in the Eden District of the English county of Cumbria. In 2001 it had a population of 96. The population at the 2011 Census was less than 100 and data was included with Temple Sowerby.

Newbiggin station opened in 1876 and closed in 1970.

See also

Listed buildings in Newbiggin, Kirkby Thore

References

External links

 Cumbria County History Trust: Newbiggin (nb: provisional research only – see Talk page)

Villages in Cumbria
Civil parishes in Cumbria
Eden District